The West Midlands Metro is a passenger light rail line in the West Midlands conurbation in England, which opened in 1999. Its rolling stock consists of 21 CAF Urbos 3 trams which came into service in 2014/15, replacing the older T-69 trams which had operated the line since 1999.

Urbos 3 & Urbos 100

A new fleet of 21 CAF Urbos 3 trams began to enter service in September 2014, they replaced the old T-69 fleet in 2015. In February 2012 Centro named CAF the preferred bidder for a contract to supply 19 to 25 Urbos 3 trams. A £40 million firm order for 20 was subsequently signed, with options for five more. The first of the new trams was unveiled at the Wednesbury depot in October 2013, with the first four entering service on 5 September 2014.

The new fleet provided an increased service of 10 trams per hour in each direction, with an increased capacity of 210 passengers per tram, compared with the 156 passengers on the former T69 trams. They are low floor throughout, and consist of five sections with four articulations. Three of the modules are mounted on bogies and the other two modules are suspended.

The T69s were modified with wider steps to be compatible with the narrower platforms.

In 2016, it was announced that the Urbos 3 fleet would be fitted with rechargeable batteries to allow them to operate along various extensions of the Midland Metro network intended to be constructed without overhead lines. Tram 18 was the first to be fitted with batteries in 2017, with the final tram, number 26, being fitted by April 2020. Tram 31 was the first to receive the new blue livery and was relaunched on 16 July 2018. In May 2019, tram 19 was given a silver and blue livery with special logos to mark the 20th anniversary of the West Midlands Metro on 30 May 2019. It was given the full blue livery in February 2021. All trams now carry this livery.

In October 2019, an order was signed for 21 new Urbos 100 trams, with the option of a further 29. Eight of these were delivered in 2021, with the remaining 12 to be delivered in 2023.

Unfortunately cracks have been detected in the older Urbos 3 trams resulting in suspension of services, the most recent in March 2022. The newer Urbos 100 vehicles are not affected by these bodywork defects.

Former fleet

T-69

Sixteen T-69 trams were the original fleet, introduced into service in 1999, These were withdrawn from service gradually during 2014/15 as the new Urbos 3 fleet was introduced. The last, no. 16, was withdrawn from service in August 2015.

The T69s were used only on the Midland Metro, and were built by the Italian company AnsaldoBreda. Their closest "brothers" were the SL95 running in Oslo, Norway. The vehicles were articulated, resting on three bogies, and had low floors over about 60% of the length. The central section of the trams was low floor, with inwards facing seating at the sides, while at each end was a raised seating area, accessible by steps. Each tram had 56 seats, with space for another 100 standing.

When delivered, all trams carried a livery of a purple body, red fronts, grey skirt and yellow doors, but several were refurbished and repainted in Network West Midlands' silver and magenta livery. From their entry into service, each tram had a roller-blind style destination board; in 2013, these were replaced with new LED Destination boards on all trams.

Most trams were named after local celebrities or people of note. After withdrawal 1-15 were placed in storage at Long Marston. In February 2016 proposals were unveiled to convert the Isle of Wight Island Line into a tram line. It was reported that the remaining T-69s could be purchased second hand and re-used for this scheme. However, this proposal never came to fruition, and in 2018 tram 11 was donated for preservation. Tram 16 was originally planned to be retained as an engineering tram, but has now also been stored at Long Marston. The remaining 12 were sold for scrap.  In July 2022 Transport for West Midlands scrapped "preserved" tram 11. Trams 07, 10 and 16 remain in storage at Long Marston however in June 2022 tram 10 was repainted into a advert for British Transport Police for use during a demonstration at the annual Rail Live event.

Maintenance vehicles
National Express Midland Metro, the former operator of the tramway until 2018, acquired a number of vehicles for maintaining the line. These included a Unimog, and road-rail lifting platform. These vehicles have been transferred to the new operator, Transport for West Midlands, and are still in use today.

References

Bibliography

 

Rolling stock
Tram vehicles of the United Kingdom
Transport in Wolverhampton
AnsaldoBreda trams
Train-related introductions in 1999
Train-related introductions in 2014
750 V DC multiple units